Mount Molloy is a rural town and locality in the Shire of Mareeba, Queensland, Australia. In the  the locality of Mount Molloy had a population of 254 people.

Geography 
The town is in the west of the locality with the centre and eastern part of the locality being protected within Kuranda National Park and the Kuranda West Forest Reserve.

Mount Molloy lies within both the Mitchell River and Barron River water catchment areas.

Nearby towns are Julatten, Mount Carbine and Mount Mulligan.  Quaid Road terminates south of Mount Molloy.

History
Djabugay (also knowen as Djabuganjdji, Tjupakai) is a language of Far North Queensland, particularly the area around the Kuranda Range and Barron River Catchment. The Djabugay language region includes the landscape within the local government boundaries of Cairns Regional Council.

At its height Mount Molloy was a copper mine in the 1890s. It was commonly used as camping grounds and Chinese market gardeners used to grow grain and other foodstuffs for the miners nearby.

A private railway was constructed to Mount Molloy, junctioning from the Cairns to Mareeba line at Biboohra, opening in August 1908. It was built by Mount Molloy Limited to serve its smelters. The line was transferred to Queensland Railways on 1 March 1917 following the liquidation of the company and was extended to Rumula on 5 December 1926. The branch closed on 1 May 1964.

Molloy Post Office opened by July 1905 and was renamed Mount Molloy in 1982.

Mount Molloy was named after Patrick Molloy, an early teamster for a stock route and the person who discovered copper at what was to become Mount Molloy.

Today the dominant industry of Mount Molloy is now cattle grazing and consists of a few shops and an old hotel.

The Mount Molloy State School opened on 23 July 1906 and is located on 30-40 Fraser Road.  It is a Prep to Year 6 co-educational school.

Between 2008 and 2013, Mount Molloy (and the rest of the Shire of Mareeba) was within the Tablelands Region.

At the 2011 census, the town and surrounding area had a population of 273.

In the  the locality of Mount Molloy had a population of 254 people.

Heritage listings
Mount Molloy has a number of heritage-listed sites, including:
 Bakers Road: James Venture Mulligan's Grave
 corner of Santowski Crescent and the Peninsular Development Road: Johnston's Sawmill Steam Plant

Education 
Mount Molloy State School is a government primary (Prep-6) school for boys and girls at Fraser Road. In 2018, the school had an enrolment of 44 students with 3 teachers and 7 non-teaching staff (4 full-time equivalent).

There is no secondary school in Mount Molloy. The nearest government secondary schools are Mossman State High School in Mossman to the north and Mareeba State High School in Mareeba to the south.

Community groups 
The Mount Molloy branch of the Queensland Country Women's Association meets at the CWA Hall at 31 Main Street (Mulligan Highway).

References

External links

 
Mitchell River Watershed Management Group

Mining towns in Queensland
Towns in Queensland
Shire of Mareeba
Localities in Queensland